Calliotropis eucheloides is a species of sea snail, a marine gastropod mollusk in the family Eucyclidae.

Description
The length of the shell reaches 10 mm.

Distribution
This marine species occurs off the Philippines, New Caledonia, the Solomon Islands and the Kermadec Islands.

References

 Vilvens C. (2007) New records and new species of Calliotropis from Indo-Pacific. Novapex 8 (Hors Série 5): 1–72.

External links
 

eucheloides
Gastropods described in 1979